Volodymyr Mykolaiovych Babayev (born on January 10, 1952, in Kharkiv) is a Ukrainian scholar and politician. He served as the rector of the Kharkiv National Academy of Urban Economy and, briefly in 2010, as the acting head of administration of Kharkiv Oblast. He was a recipient of the State Prize for Architecture in 1999.

References

1952 births
Living people
Governors of Kharkiv Oblast
Laureates of the State Prize of Ukraine in the Field of Architecture
Laureates of the Honorary Diploma of the Verkhovna Rada of Ukraine
Recipients of the Honorary Diploma of the Cabinet of Ministers of Ukraine
Kharkiv National Academy of Urban Economy rectors